Cass Township is one of seventeen townships in Cedar County, Iowa, USA.  As of the 2000 census, its population was 295.

History
The first settler in Cass Township was William Kester, who arrived about 1837.

Geography
According to the USGS, it contains four cemeteries: Cass, Evergreen, Mathews and Shawver.

References

External links
 US-Counties.com
 City-Data.com

Townships in Cedar County, Iowa
Townships in Iowa